Abigail Burland, known professionally as Abigail Asante, is a British rapper, dancer, and Internet personality. She initially gained prominence through dance videos she posted to Instagram. She made her music debut in collaboration with Ivorian Doll, releasing singles under the name Abigail × Ivorian Doll.

Asante now performs as a solo act. She has since released her own solo singles, including "Stupid" and "Liar", and "Bad Gyal Bounce", a collaboration with Brixx.

Early life
Asante is of Ghanaian descent.

References

British Internet celebrities
English people of Ghanaian descent
Living people
Black British women rappers
Rappers from London
UK drill musicians
Year of birth missing (living people)